The 1927 Colgate football team was an American football team that represented Colgate University as an independent during the 1927 college football season. In its fourth and final season under head coach Dick Harlow, the team compiled a 7–0–2 record and outscored opponents by a total of 219 to 34. The team was ranked No. 4 in the nation in the Dickinson System ratings released in January 1926. The team played its home games on Whitnall Field in Hamilton, New York.

Halfback and team captain Eddie Tryon was selected as an All American.  He was later inducted into the College Football Hall of Fame.

Schedule

References

Colgate
Colgate Raiders football seasons
College football undefeated seasons
Colgate football